Vandal Love is a novel by American-Canadian author D. Y. Béchard. It was first published in 2006 by Doubleday Canada.

The novel follows generations of an unusual French-Canadian family across North America, and through the twentieth century, as they struggle to find their place in the world. A family curse – a genetic trick resulting from centuries of hardship – causes the Hervé children to be born either giants or runts.

Book I of Vandal Love follows the giants’ line, exploring Jude Hervé's career as a boxer in Georgia and Louisiana in the 1960s, his escape from that brutal life alone with his baby daughter Isa, and her eventual decision to enter into a strange, chaste marriage with a much older man.

Book II traces a different kind of life entirely, as the runts of the family discover that their power lies in a kind of unifying love. François searches for years for his missing father; his own son, Harvey, flees from modern society into spiritual quests. But none of the Hervés can abandon their longing for a place where they might find others like themselves.

Publishing history
Doubleday Canada (January 17, 2006)

Awards
2007 - Commonwealth Writers' Prize Best First Book

External links
Review by Ami Sands Brodoff in Montreal Review of Books, Spring 2006 Nineteenth Issue, Volume 9, No. 3

2006 Canadian novels
Novels about boxing
Doubleday Canada books